Santa Catarina Barahona is a municipality in the Guatemalan department of Sacatepéquez.

Municipalities of the Sacatepéquez Department